Elliott Nunatak is a large nunatak,  high, jutting out from the center of the Bermel Escarpment, in the Thiel Mountains of Antarctica. The name, for Raymond L. Elliott, a geologist with the United States Geological Survey Thiel Mountains party that surveyed these mountains in 1960–61, was proposed by Peter Bermel and Arthur Ford, co-leaders of the party.

References 

Nunataks of Ellsworth Land